The IBM 303X is a discontinued line of mainframe computers, the first model of which, the IBM 3033 Processor, nicknamed "The Big One", was introduced March 25, 1977.

Two additional processors, the 3031 and the 3032, were announced on October 6, 1977.

All three 303X systems were withdrawn on February 5, 1985.

Features
The CPUs feature instruction pipelining, "several instructions can be pre-fetched while one is being executed". "Processor storage ... is four-way interleaved" resulting in "a significantly faster data rate than... non-interleaved". Each of the three systems includes, as a standard feature, a Dual-display console, the newly announced IBM 3036. The systems consume less than half the floor space of a System/370 with an equal amount of computer memory and an identical number of channels because "the channels are physically integrated within the processor mainframe." Each group of six channels has its own microprogrammed channel processor, a System/370-158-type processor running special channel microcode.

The initial announcement of the 3033 also introduced new operating system versions "MVS/System Extensions (MVS/SE) and VM/System Extensions (VM/SE)."

303X as successor to System 370
Beginning in 1977, IBM began to introduce new systems, using the following descriptions:
 "A compatible member of the System/370 family."  
 "System/370 Compatible - 303(1/2/3)"
 "the System/370 3033 Processor."

Competing compatibles
At this time, other companies, known as plug compatible manufacturers (PCMs), were competing with IBM by producing IBM-compatible systems. By the late 1970s and early 1980s, patented technology allowed Amdahl IBM-compatible mainframes of this era to be completely air-cooled, unlike IBM systems that required chilled water and its supporting infrastructure— the 8 largest of the 18 models of the ES/9000 systems introduced in 1990 were water-cooled; the other ten were air-cooled.

"The 3033 model, introduced in response to competition from the Amdahl Corporation, represented almost a 100 percent improvement in performance over the previous model, at only a 12 percent increase in price". The improvement in Price–performance of the 303X models created volume of orders sufficient to cause a backlog. "The backlog backfired. IBM inadvertently gave Amdahl a huge boost when the results of its "delivery lottery" pushed some customer shipments all the way into 1980".

In October, 1977 Computerworld reported that Itel's "air-cooled AS/6" was announced "within six hours of the IBM announcement" and due to ship "the same time deliveries of the IBM 3032 are slated to begin."

Magnuson Computer Systems also produced the M80 System/370-compatible computer system between 1975 and 1980.

IBM 3031
The 3031 features a machine cycle time of 115 nanoseconds (ns). It has a cache (called "high speed buffer storage" in IBM terminology) size of 32 KB. Main storage may be 2 to 6 MB, in 1 MB increments. One group of six channels is standard. This group of channels contains one byte multiplexer and five block multiplexer channels. An optional channel-to-channel adapter (CTCA) is available. At announcement the monthly lease price for a minimally configured 3031 processor (2 MB, without peripherals) was $27,497. The 3031 is supported by  MVS, OS/VS1 SVS,  VM/370, ACP, and TSS/370, and DOS/VS, the last of which is not mentioned as supported by the other 303X models.

Models
The 3031 has 15 models, distinguished by the amount of main storage installed.

IBM 3032
The 3032 features a machine cycle time of 80ns. It has a cache size of 32 KB. Main storage may be 2, 4, or 6 MB. One group of six channels is standard; this can optionally be expanded by the addition of another six. Each group of channels contains one byte multiplexer and five block multiplexer channels. An optional feature allows the first block multiplexer in each group to operate at 3 MB per second. An optional channel-to-channel adapter (CTCA) is available. At announcement the monthly lease price for a minimally configured 3032 processor (without peripherals) was $43,740. The 3032 is supported by  MVS, OS/VS1 SVS,  VM/370, ACP, and TSS/370.

Models
The 3032 has 4 models, distinguished by the amount of main storage installed.

IBM 3033
The 3033 features a machine cycle time of 58ns. It has a cache size of 64 KB. Main storage may be 4, 6, or 8 MB. Two groups of six channels are standard; this can optionally be expanded by the addition of another six. Each group of channels contains one byte multiplexer and five block multiplexer channels. An optional channel group is available consisting of either four block multiplexer channels or one byte multiplexer and three block multiplexers. An optional feature allows the first block multiplexer in each group to operate at 3 MB per second. Two optional channel-to-channel adapters (CTCA) are available. At announcement the monthly lease price for a minimally configured 3033 processor (without peripherals) was $70,400. The 3033 is supported by  MVS, OS/VS1 SVS,  VM/370, and ACP.

The 3033-N, a slightly slower model, was introduced Nov. 1, 1979, and the 3033-S, with about 2/3 the speed of the original 3033 model, was introduced a year later, on November 12, 1980. Each shipped the following quarter; both were withdrawn in 1985, along with the other 303X offerings.

The 3033 was later made available in attached-processor (AP) and multiprocessor (MP) dyadic configurations.

Models
The 3033 had 29 models.

Photos
 IBM 3031
 IBM 3032
 IBM 3032; note IBM 3036 Dual-display console, partial view of Univac 1108 on right side
 IBM 3033

See also
 IBM System/360
 IBM System/370
 IBM 9370

Notes

References

Further reading
  Chapter 8 (pp. 223240) describes the 3033.

IBM System/360 mainframe line
32-bit computers